Regional elections were held in Denmark in 1902. 7 municipal council members were elected for Copenhagen's municipal council. The voter turnout was 45.5%.

References

1902
Denmark
Elections